Domenico Pozzovivo (born 30 November 1982) is an Italian professional road racing cyclist, who currently rides for UCI ProTeam . His very small stature confer him with the qualities of a pure climbing specialist. He is most known for a victory in stage 8 of the 2012 Giro d'Italia, an overall victory in the 2012 Giro del Trentino, and is notable for his educational attainments.

Personal life

Pozzovivo has a degree in economics and wrote a thesis entitled "Southern politics from the unity of Italy up to the present day". His educational attainments have earned him the nickname "Dr. Pozzovivo" in the peloton. He stated that his fields of interest outside cycling are history, technology, economics, politics and weather forecasts. He also speaks French fluently and stated that a jump into politics would interest him after his cycling career.

Career

In 2008, Pozzovivo finished on the third step of the podium of the Giro del Trentino, which had a race categorization of 2.1. The first place went to Vincenzo Nibali of  while Stefano Garzelli from the  took the second place. He then participated in his third Giro d'Italia. While he was not considered a favorite for the overall rankings prior to the race, he managed to finish in ninth position of the general classification. He notably took the second position on the fifteenth stage, a mountain affair finishing atop the Category 1 Passo Fedaia, which was featured for the first time in Giro history. He was bested only by his team-mate Emanuele Sella, who eventually tested positive for the blood booster MIRCERA and was later disqualified.

2009

In 2009, Pozzovivo took the fifth stage of the Settimana Ciclistica Lombarda, his first major victory since 2004. He also finished second in the general classification of the mountainous Brixia Tour, more than a minute behind the winner Giampaolo Caruso. He placed in the top ten of three stages in that race, including third on the second stage, three second in arrears of Leonardo Bertagnolli.

2010

Pozzovivo finally took the third place overall, with the Kazakh Alexander Vinokourov of  taking the top honors. Pozzovivo came in second place of the 2.1 categorized Giro dell'Appennino, where he attacked on the daunting Passo della Bocchetta, with only Robert Kišerlovski being able to follow him and crest the climb with him. The pair collaborated well to the finish, where Pozzovivo was bested by the  man in the sprint, therefore taking second place. In July, the diminutive Pozzovivo won the Brixia Tour, winning two mountain stages in the process. He prevailed in the overall classification of the five stage race by a margin of one minute and fifty seconds over 's Morris Possoni.

2012

In 2012, Pozzovivo won the prestigious Giro del Trentino. He was victorious in stage 3 of that race, which led the riders from Pergine to Brenzone sul Garda, finishing after a steep climb, the Punta Veleno. Team cars were not allowed on that climb since it was very steep and the tarmac was inappropriate. Motorbikes were the only resource available for riders suffering a mechanical problem. The victory on that hard stage granted him the leader's jersey, which he managed to hold on to the following day on the fourth and final stage, which was disputed in snowy weather conditions. He finished that stage in third position. He also won the mountains classification jersey.

He finished the Giro eighth overall, being always very competitive in the mountain stages. In June, Pozzovivo prevailed in the queen stage of the 2.1 rated Tour of Slovenia, a  course peppered with climbs. With that operation, he took the overall classification leader's jersey thanks to a six-second lead over Brajkovič, but lost it the next day in the individual time trial, where Brajkovič bested him by ten seconds. Pozzovivo had to settle for the second place of the Tour.

In the fall, Pozzovivo took part in the Italian Classic Giro dell'Emilia and launched an attack in the steepest part of the final climb, while he was part of a small leading group of three riders. Nairo Quintana resisted in his wheel to place an attack of his own, which would prove to be the decisive move as the Colombian sailed to victory. Pozzovivo was passed by two competitors in the final meters and took the fourth place. Days later, Pozzovivo abandoned during the Giro di Lombardia, a race which suited him well in the past. The cold and heavy rain played a part in this outcome, as none of his Colnago team-mates reached the finish line either.

2013
For the 2013 season, Pozzovivo left , where he started his professional career back in 2005, and moved to World Tour outfit . He was looking to repeat his 2012 win in the Giro del Trentino, but he had to withdraw after a crash in stage 3 of the race where he injured his elbow and broke two ribs. Due to this injury, and some unfortunate crashes, he was unable to perform to his best ability in the  Giro d'Italia, although he still managed to finish 10th overall, his third top ten in the Giro.

In the Vuelta, Pozzovivo was able to return to his best. He was consistently in the top 10 during the mountain stages, and ended up finishing 6th overall, his highest finish thus far in a Grand Tour. He particularly surprised in the Stage 11 Time Trial, a discipline which generally does not suit him, where he finished third behind winner Fabian Cancellara and World Champion time trial champion at the time Tony Martin.

2014

Pozzovivo took part in the Roma Maxima, where he escaped with Alejandro Valverde. The pair maintained their lead until the bunch caught Pozzovivo metres before the line. Valverde won, while Pozzovivo took fifth place. He finished sixth in the Tirreno–Adriatico stage race a week later.

Pozzovivo continued his preparation for his main goal in 2014, the Giro d'Italia, by racing the Giro del Trentino, where he finished second to Cadel Evans. Two days later, he was one of the main protagonists in Liege-Bastogne-Liege, a race he was participating in for the first time.

Pozzovivo started the Giro well, avoiding any crashes during the wet opening week and attacking on Stage 9 to Sestola, where he finished third on the day behind the breakaway, taking 30 seconds from his rivals and moving into 4th in the General Classification. He also attacked successfully on Stage 14 to Oropa, but fell ill with Bronchitis on the next day, a mountain top finish at Montecampione, losing time to nearly all his rivals. He managed to recover sufficiently during the rest day to win back time on the remaining peloton on the Queen Stage up to Val Martello on Stage 16, after Nairo Quintana, Pierre Rolland and Ryder Hesjedal had gone away earlier in the stage. He also managed to move up in the overall standings on both Stages 18 and 19, a mountain-top finish and an uphill time trial. He eventually finished in 5th place, his highest ever finish in the Giro up to that point and his first ever top-5 finish in a Grand Tour.

Pozzovivo did not participate in the Tour de France to focus his efforts on the Vuelta a España. However, he had to forget the Spain Grand Tour when he crashed in training, breaking his tibia. Pozzovivo said in an interview that he was able to bicycle before he was able to walk on his way to recovery and that he sent his team an e-mail to the effect that he was ready to come back sooner than expected, at the Il Lombardia race. "It's a crazy idea and so it might not be taken into consideration [by the team]. I have suffered and I still suffer physically but I believe that that the head makes the difference." Ultimately, Pozzovivo's return race was Milano–Torino at the end of 2014 and he did race the Il Lombardia race afterward.

2015

Pozzovivo started his season in January at Australia's Tour Down Under, despite suffering from a minor wrist fracture. He stated he was aiming for a top 5 Overall. He finally finished sixth in the general classification. In March, he went on to finish eighth overall in Tirreno–Adriatico. He grabbed his first victory since 2012 on a stage of the Volta a Catalunya. He was part of a group of seven favorites and he attacked two kilometers from the finish line to win solo on the flat finale, after the race went over several climbs. He finally finished the stage race on the third step of the podium. At the end of April, Pozzovivo participated in the mountainous Giro del Trentino. He lost time on Stage 2, but made up for it by taking the stage victory on Stage 3, distancing Richie Porte and Mikel Landa by five seconds after attacking with two kilometers remaining. He finally finished seventh in the general classification of the race. Two days after the Giro del Trentino concluded, Pozzovivo finished eighth of Liège–Bastogne–Liège as part of the leading group.

Pozzovivo's next objective was the Giro d'Italia, but things got off to a bad start: after losing time on the opening team time trial, he lost more than a minute on the second stage because of a crash. Shortly afterwards, AG2R reported that he was in a stable state, even though he appeared to be bleeding heavily from his head region on television pictures. On the same night, he passed a CT scan which revealed no brain injury and talked to La Gazzetta dello Sport: "It was a long night and I even made some plans for the future," said Pozzovivo. "I was in the best condition of my life and I’m thinking about returning at the Tour de Suisse and being competitive."

Pozzovivo did return at the Tour de Suisse and registered second place on the queen stage of the race, a  affair which finished at the foot of the Rettenbach glacier. He finished the event in fifth position in the general classification. He then participated in the National Road Race Championships where he came in sixth.

2018
AT the mountainous Tour of the Alps, Pozzovivo took his first podium of the year, finishing in second place overall thanks to continuous top-10 placings during the stages, and second place in best climber jersey as well. The next Sunday, he got fifth at Liège–Bastogne–Liège. He was the team's leader at the Giro d'Italia, finishing fifth in the general classification, came third in the Italian National Road Race Championships, and also raced at the Tour de France.

2019
Pozzovivo came second in the Tour of Oman, and rode in the Giro d'Italia. On 11 August 2019, Pozzovivo was severely injured after colliding with a car during a training ride. He was "hit head on" by the car and suffered fractures to his right leg, left arm, collarbone, and ribs. According to Cycling Weekly, it was doubtful if Pozzovivo would return to racing, considering the severity of his injuries.

2020
He was forced to abandon the Tour de France after stage 9 due to another injury to his elbow caused by a crash on the opening stage. He then rode the Giro d'Italia to an eventual 11th place overall. Following the Giro d'Italia, he underwent more surgery on his elbow.

2021
Pozzovivo remained with the now-renamed , beginning his season at the UAE Tour. In the Giro d'Italia, he sustained another injury to his left elbow which forced him to abandon the race after stage 6. He recovered to ride to sixth place in the Tour de Suisse, and was as high as third at the Vuelta a Burgos but was forced to withdraw with a fractured knee. Due to financial troubles, the team disbanded at the end of 2021, having failed to secure sufficient sponsorship for a UCI WorldTeam licence, and Pozzovivo was left without a team and contemplating retirement.

2022
Pozzovivo joined the  team midway through February, making his first start at the Vuelta a Andalucía. He finished in the top-ten overall at the Giro d'Italia and the Tour de Suisse.

Major results

2002
 6th Overall GP Kranj
2003
 4th GP Kranj
 5th GP Città di Felino
 6th Liège–Bastogne–Liège U23
 7th Gran Premio Palio del Recioto
2004
 2nd Overall Giro della Valle d'Aosta
 2nd GP Città di Felino
 3rd Overall Girobio
 3rd Gran Premio Palio del Recioto
 4th Road race, UCI Under-23 Road World Championships
 5th Trofeo Alcide Degasperi
 6th Trofeo Banca Popolare di Vicenza
 6th Giro del Belvedere
 7th GP Capodarco
 9th Overall Giro della Regione Friuli Venezia Giulia
1st Stage 4
 10th Gran Premio San Giuseppe
 10th Trofeo Gianfranco Bianchin
2005
 5th Giro dell'Appennino
2007
 3rd Overall Settimana Ciclistica Lombarda
 8th Gran Premio Nobili Rubinetterie
2008
 3rd Overall Giro del Trentino
 5th Overall Brixia Tour
 9th Overall Giro d'Italia
2009
 1st Stage 5 Settimana Ciclistica Lombarda
 2nd Overall Brixia Tour
 3rd Overall Tour of Slovenia
 5th Overall Giro del Trentino
 6th Overall Settimana Internazionale di Coppi e Bartali
 6th Coppa Sabatini
 7th Trofeo Melinda
 9th Overall Tour de Luxembourg
 9th Giro dell'Appennino
2010
 1st  Overall Brixia Tour
1st Stages 2 & 4
 2nd Giro dell'Appennino
 2nd Tre Valli Varesine
 3rd Overall Giro del Trentino
1st Stage 4
 3rd Trofeo Matteotti
 3rd Giro della Romagna
 5th Trofeo Melinda
 6th Coppa Sabatini
 6th Giro dell'Emilia
 7th Overall Tirreno–Adriatico
 7th Giro del Piemonte
 8th Overall Giro di Sardegna
2011
 2nd Overall Brixia Tour
1st Stage 4
 2nd Tre Valli Varesine
 3rd Trofeo Melinda
 4th Overall Vuelta a Castilla y León
 4th Overall Giro del Trentino
 5th Overall Settimana Ciclistica Lombarda
 6th Giro di Lombardia
 6th Giro di Toscana
 6th Gran Premio Nobili Rubinetterie
 7th Overall Tour de Langkawi
 8th Overall Giro di Padania
 8th Giro dell'Emilia
 10th Overall Settimana Internazionale di Coppi e Bartali
 10th Coppa Sabatini
2012
 1st  Overall Giro del Trentino
1st  Mountains classification
1st Stage 3
 2nd Overall Tour of Slovenia
1st Stage 3
 4th Overall Giro di Padania
1st Stage 1b (TTT)
 4th Giro dell'Emilia
 4th Gran Premio Città di Camaiore
 5th Gran Premio Bruno Beghelli
 7th Trofeo Melinda
 7th Milano–Torino
 8th Overall Giro d'Italia
1st Stage 8
 8th GP Industria & Artigianato di Larciano
 10th Tre Valli Varesine
2013
 4th Milano–Torino
 6th Overall Vuelta a España
 7th Overall Tour de Pologne
 7th Eschborn–Frankfurt City Loop
 9th Overall Tour of Oman
 9th Giro dell'Emilia
 10th Overall Giro d'Italia
2014
 2nd Overall Giro del Trentino
 5th Overall Giro d'Italia
 5th Roma Maxima
 5th Liège–Bastogne–Liège
 6th Overall Tour of Oman
 6th Overall Tirreno–Adriatico
 8th Overall Volta a Catalunya
 10th Overall Tour de San Luis
2015
 3rd Overall Volta a Catalunya
1st Stage 3
 5th Overall Tour de Suisse
 6th Overall Tour Down Under
 7th Overall Giro del Trentino
1st Stage 3
 7th Milano–Torino
 8th Overall Tirreno–Adriatico
 8th Liège–Bastogne–Liège
 10th Overall Tour de l'Ain
2016
 7th Overall Tour Down Under
 7th Overall Giro del Trentino
 7th Tour du Doubs
 8th Overall Tour of Oman
 10th Overall Vuelta a Burgos
2017
 3rd Overall Tour of the Alps
 4th Overall Tour de Suisse
1st Stage 6
 6th Overall Giro d'Italia
 6th Overall Tour de Pologne
 6th Giro di Lombardia
 9th Overall Abu Dhabi Tour
 10th Overall Tirreno–Adriatico
2018
 2nd Overall Tour of the Alps
1st  Mountains classification
 3rd Road race, National Road Championships
 3rd Giro della Toscana
 5th Overall Giro d'Italia
 5th Liège–Bastogne–Liège
 6th Gran Premio di Lugano
 7th Milano–Torino
 8th Giro di Lombardia
 9th Giro dell'Emilia
2019
 2nd Overall Tour of Oman
 7th Overall Tour de Suisse
2021
 6th Overall Tour de Suisse
2022
 3rd Giro dell'Emilia
 5th Coppa Ugo Agostoni
 8th Overall Giro d'Italia
 8th Tre Valli Varesine
 9th Overall Tour de Suisse

General classification results timeline

Monuments results timeline

References

External links

 
 
 
 
 

1982 births
Living people
Italian male cyclists
Italian Giro d'Italia stage winners
Cyclists from Basilicata
Tour de Suisse stage winners